The Oberlin Group of Libraries is a consortium of liberal arts college libraries. The group evolved from meetings of college presidents in 1985 and 1986 at Oberlin College. , it has 80 members.

Agnes Scott College (GA)
Albion College (MI)
Allegheny College (PA)
Alma College (MI)
Amherst College (MA)
Augustana College (IL)
Austin College (TX)
Bard College (NY)
Barnard College (NY)
Bates College (ME)
Beloit College (WI)
Berea College (KY)
Bowdoin College (ME)
Bryn Mawr College (PA)
Bucknell University (PA)
Carleton College (MN)
Claremont McKenna College (CA)
Clark University (MA)
Coe College (IA)
Colby College (ME)
Colgate University (NY)
Colorado College (CO)
Connecticut College (CT)
Davidson College (NC)
Denison University (OH)
DePauw University (IN)
Dickinson College (PA)
Drew University (NJ)
Earlham College (IN)
Eckerd College (FL)
Franklin & Marshall College (PA)
Furman University (SC)
Gettysburg College (PA)
Grinnell College (IA)
Gustavus Adolphus College (MN)
Hamilton College (NY)
Harvey Mudd College (CA)
Haverford College (PA)
College of the Holy Cross (MA)
Hope College (MI)
Kalamazoo College (MI)
Kenyon College (OH)
Knox College (IL)
Lafayette College (PA)
Lake Forest College (IL)
Lawrence University (WI)
Macalester College (MN)
Manhattan College (NY)
Middlebury College (VT)
Mills College (CA)
Morehouse College (GA)
Mount Holyoke College (MA)
Oberlin College (OH)
Occidental College (CA)
Ohio Wesleyan University (OH)
Pitzer College (CA)
Pomona College (CA)
Randolph-Macon College (VA)
Reed College (OR)
Rhodes College (TN)
Rollins College (FL)
Sarah Lawrence College (NY)
Scripps College (CA)
Sewanee: The University of the South (TN)
Simmons University (MA)
Skidmore College (NY)
Smith College (MA)
Spelman College (GA)
College of Saint Benedict and Saint John's University (MN)
St. Lawrence University(NY)
St. Olaf College (MN)
Swarthmore College (PA)
Trinity College (CT)
Trinity University (TX)
Union College (NY)
Vassar College (NY)
Wabash College (IN)
Washington and Lee University  (VA)
Wellesley College (MA)
Wesleyan University (CT)
Wheaton College (MA)
Whitman College (WA)
Whittier College (CA)
Willamette University (OR)
Williams College (MA)
College of Wooster (OH)

References

External links
 

College and university associations and consortia in the United States
Library consortia in the United States